Rock-climbing equipment requires a range of specialized sports equipment, for training, for aid climbing (i.e. to assist in ascending by artificial means), and for free climbing (where protection equipment is needed against the consequences of a fall).  Developments in rock-climbing equipment played an important role in the history of rock climbing, enabling climbers to ascend more difficult climbing routes safely, and materially improving the strength, conditioning, and ability of climbers.

Rope, tape and webbing 

Climbing ropes are usually of kernmantle construction, consisting of a core (kern) of long twisted fibres and an outer sheath (mantle) of woven coloured fibres.  The core provides about 70% of the tensile strength, while the sheath is a durable layer that protects the core and gives the rope desirable handling characteristics.

Ropes used for climbing can be divided into two classes: dynamic ropes and low-elongation ropes (sometimes called "static" ropes). Dynamic ropes are designed to absorb the energy of a falling climber and are usually used as belaying ropes. When a climber falls, the rope stretches, reducing the maximum force experienced by the climber, their belayer, and equipment. Low elongation ropes stretch much less and are usually used in anchoring systems. They are also used for abseiling (rappelling) and as fixed ropes  climbed with ascenders.

Modern webbing or "tape" is made of nylon or Spectra/Dyneema, or a combination of the two. Climbing-specific nylon webbing is generally tubular webbing, that is, it is a tube of nylon pressed flat. In 2010, UK-based DMM performed fall factor 1 and 2 tests on various Dyneema and Nylon webbings, showing Dyneema slings can fail even under 60 cm falls. Tying knots in Dyneema webbing was proven to have reduced the total amount of supported force by as much as half.

When webbing is sewn or tied together at the ends, it becomes a sling or runner, and if you clip a carabiner to each end of the sling, you have a quickdraw. These loops are made one of two ways—sewn (using reinforced stitching) or tied. Both ways of forming runners have advantages and drawbacks, and it is for the individual climber to choose which to use. Generally speaking, most climbers carry a few of both types. It is also important to note that only nylon can be safely knotted into a runner (usually using a water knot or beer knot), Dyneema is always sewn because the fibers are too slippery to hold a knot under weight.

Webbing has many uses such as:
 Extending the distance between the climbing protection and a tie-in point.
 An anchor around a tree or rock.
 An anchor extension or equalization.
 Makeshift harnesses.
 Carrying equipment (clipped to a sling worn over the shoulder).
 Protecting a rope that hangs over a sharp edge (tubular webbing).

Carabiners 

Carabiners are metal loops with spring-loaded gates (openings), used as connectors. Once made primarily from steel, almost all carabiners for recreational climbing are now made from a lightweight but very strong aluminum alloy. Steel carabiners are much heavier, but harder wearing, and therefore are often used by instructors when working with groups.

Carabiners exist in various forms; the shape of the carabiner and the type of gate varies according to the use for which it is intended. There are two major varieties: locking and non-locking carabiners. Locking carabiners offer a method of preventing the gate from opening when in use. Locking carabiners are used for important connections, such as at the anchor point or a belay device. There are several different types of locking carabiners, including a twist-lock and a thread-lock. Twist-lock carabiners are commonly referred to as "auto-locking carabiners" due to their spring-loaded locking mechanism. Non-locking carabiners are commonly found as a component of quickdraws.

Carabiners are made with many different types of gates including wire-gate, bent-gate, and straight-gate. The different gates have different strengths and uses. Most locking carabiners utilize a straight gate. Bent-gate and wire-gate carabiners are usually found on the rope-end of quickdraws, as they facilitate easier rope clipping than straight-gate carabiners.

Carabiners are also known by many slang names including biner (pronounced beaner) or Krab.

The first climber who used a carabiner for climbing was German climber .

The Maillon (or Maillon Rapide) performs a similar function to a carabiner but instead of a hinge, it has an internally threaded sleeve engaging with threads on each end of the link and is available in various shapes and sizes. They are very strong but more difficult to open, either deliberately or accidentally, so are used for links which do not need to be released during normal use, such as the center of a harness.

Quickdraws

Quickdraws (often referred to as "draws") are used by climbers to connect ropes to bolt anchors, or to other traditional protection, allowing the rope to move through the anchoring system with minimal friction. A quickdraw consists of two non-locking carabiners connected together by a short, pre-sewn loop of webbing. Alternatively, and quite regularly, the pre-sewn webbing is replaced by a sling of the above-mentioned dyneema/nylon webbing. This is usually of a 60 cm loop and can be tripled over between the carabiners to form a 20 cm loop. Then when more length is needed the sling can be turned back into a 60 cm loop offering more versatility than a pre-sewn loop. Carabiners used for clipping into the protection generally have a straight gate, decreasing the possibility of the carabiner accidentally unclipping from the protection. The carabiner into which the rope is clipped often has a bent gate, so that clipping the rope into this carabiner can be done quickly and easily. Quickdraws are also frequently used in indoor lead climbing. The quickdraw may be pre-attached to the wall. When a climber ascends the wall, (s)he must clip the rope through the quickdraw in order to maintain safety. The safest, easiest and most effective place to clip into a quickdraw is when it is at waist height.

Harnesses 

A harness is a system used for connecting the rope to the climber. There are two loops at the front of the harness where the climber ties into the rope at the working end using a figure-eight knot. Most harnesses used in climbing are preconstructed and are worn around the pelvis and hips, although other types are used occasionally.

Different types of climbing warrant particular features for harnesses.  Sport climbers typically use minimalistic harnesses, some with sewn-on gear loops.  Alpine climbers often choose lightweight harnesses, perhaps with detachable leg loops. Big Wall climbers generally prefer padded waist belts and leg loops. There are also full body harnesses for children, whose pelvises may be too narrow to support a standard  harness safely. These harnesses prevent children from falling even when inverted, and are either manufactured for children or constructed out of webbing. Some climbers use full body harnesses when there is a chance of inverting, or when carrying a heavy bag.  There are also chest harnesses, which are used only in combination with a sit harness. Test results from UIAA show that chest harnesses do not put more impact on the neck than sit harnesses, giving them the same advantages as full body harness.

Apart from these harnesses, there are also caving and canyoning harnesses, which all serve different purposes.  For example, a caving harness is made of tough waterproof and unpadded material, with dual attachment points.  Releasing the maillon from these attachment points loosens the harness quickly.

Canyoning harnesses are somewhat like climbing harnesses, often without the padding, but with a seat protector, making it more comfortable to rappel.  These usually have a single attachment point of Dyneema.

Belay devices 

Belay devices are mechanical friction brake devices used to control a rope when belaying. Their main purpose is to allow the rope to be locked off with minimal effort to arrest a climber's fall. Multiple kinds of belay devices exist, such as tubers (for example the Black Diamond ATC) or active assisted-braking devices (for example the Petzl Grigri), some of which may additionally be used as descenders for controlled descent on a rope, as in abseiling or rappelling.

If a belay device is lost or damaged, a Munter hitch on a carabiner can be used as an improvised passive belay device.

Rappel devices (descenders) 
These devices are friction brakes which are designed for descending ropes. Many belay devices can be used as descenders, but there are descenders that are not practical for belaying, since it is too difficult to feed rope through them, or because they do not provide sufficient friction to hold a hard fall.

Figure eight 

Sometimes called "figure of eight" or just "eight", this device is most commonly used as a descender, but may also be used as a belay device in the absence of more appropriate equipment. It is an aluminum or steel "8" shaped device but comes in several varieties (e.g. the Rescue eight variation (see image opposite) with "ears" or "wings" which prevent the rope from "locking up" or creating a larks head or girth hitch).  

Key advantages of a "figure eight" are fast but controlled descent on a rope, ease of setup (both with double-ropes and with very iced-ropes), and efficient heat dissipation.  A "square eight", usually used in rescue applications, is better for rappelling as it causes less rope twist and rope-wear.

Rappel rack 
This consists of a 'U' shaped frame, attached to the rappeller's harness, into which snap multiple bars  that pivot from the other side of the frame. Racks are seldom used in sport climbing.  Cavers often use racks on long rappels because friction can be adjusted by adding or removing bars.

Ascenders 

Ascenders are mechanical devices for ascending on a rope. They are also called Jumars, after a popular brand.

Jumars perform the same functionality as friction knots but less effort is needed to use them. A Jumar employs a cam which allows the device to slide freely in one direction but tightly grip the rope when pulled on in the opposite direction. To prevent a jumar from accidentally coming off the rope, a locking carabiner is used. The Jumar is first attached to the climber's harness by a piece of webbing or sling, and then the Jumar is clipped onto the rope and locked. Two ascenders are normally used to climb a fixed rope.  For climbing a fixed rope attached to snow anchors on a steep slope, only one Jumar is used as the other hand is used for holding the ice axe.

Another type of ascender allows rope to feed in either direction, slowly, but locks up when pulled quickly.  Such self-locking devices allow people to protect solo climbs because the amount of rope is automatically adjusted.

Sling

A sling or runner is an item of climbing equipment consisting of a tied or sewn loop of webbing that can be wrapped around sections of rock, hitched (tied) to other pieces of equipment or even tied directly to a tensioned line using a prusik knot, for anchor extension (to reduce rope drag and for other purposes), equalisation, or climbing the rope.

Daisy chain

A daisy chain is a strap, several feet long and typically constructed from one-inch tubular nylon webbing of the same type used in lengthening straps between anchor-points and the main rope. The webbing is bar tacked at roughly two-inch intervals (or, in the past, tied) to create a length of small loops for attachment. Unlike the use of similar devices in backpacking, daisy chains in technical rock climbing are expected to be of sufficient strength to be "load bearing". Daisy chain pockets however are not rated to full strength, and can only take static loads.

When clipped in, daisy chains should not be shortened by clipping in another pocket to the same carabiner. Failure of the pocket stitching results in the daisy chain disconnecting from the anchor, with potentially fatal consequences. If shortening the daisy chain when clipped in, in order to eliminate dangerous slack, a second carabiner should be used to connect to the anchor.

Though daisy chains are sometimes used by free climbers as a type of sling (a quick attachment used from harness directly to a belay anchor), and for ad hoc purposes similar to those of the backpacker, the canonical use for a daisy chain is in aid climbing, wherein the leader will typically attach one end to the harness, and the other to the top-most anchor placement (by carabiner or fifi hook), particularly after having ascended in étriers as high as possible. This allows the leader to hang from the daisy chain while preparing the next anchor placement. The closely spaced loops allow fine-tuning the length from harness to anchor, thereby allowing the best possible reach for the next placement.

Daisy chains should not be confused with étriers, also known as aiders, which are short ladders made in the same way, but with larger loops, also used in aid climbing, nor with load-limiting devices often known as screamers (from their first trade name) designed to simulate a dynamic belay.

Protection devices 
Protection devices, collectively known as rock protection or pro, provide the means to place temporary anchor points on the rock.  These devices may be categorized as passive (e.g., nuts) or active such as a spring-loaded camming device or SLCD.  Passive protection acts "merely" as a choke when pulled on, and constrictions in the rock prevent it from pulling out. Active protection transforms a pull on the device into an outward pressure on the rock that helps the device set more firmly. The type of protection that is most appropriate varies depending on the nature of the rock.

Nuts 

Nuts are manufactured in many different varieties.  In their simplest form, they are just a small block of metal attached to a loop of cord or wire.  They are used by simply wedging them into narrowing cracks in the rock, then giving them a tug to set them. Nuts are sometimes referred to as stoppers, or by the slang term, wires.

Hexes 

Hexes are the oldest form of active protection. They consist of a hollow eccentric hexagonal prism with tapered ends, usually threaded with cord or webbing.  They are frequently placed as a passive chock, but are more commonly placed in active camming positions. In the standard active placement, a fall causes the hex to twist in its placement exerting sideways force on the rock in which it is placed. They are manufactured by several firms, with a range of sizes varying from about 10mm thick to 100mm wide. Sides may be straight or curved.

Spring-loaded camming devices 

These consist of three or four cams mounted on a common axle or two adjacent axles, in such a way that pulling on the shaft connected to the axle forces the cams to spread further apart.  The SLCD is used like a syringe, by pulling the cams via a "trigger" (a small handle) which forces them closer, inserting it into a crack or pocket in the rock, and then releasing the trigger. The springs make the cams expand and grip the rock face securely.  A climbing rope may then be attached to the end of the stem via a sling and carabiner.  SLCDs are typically designed to maintain a constant camming angle with the rock to ensure that the normal force provided by the cam lobes against the rock face will supply enough friction to hold a cam in equilibrium with the rock. These devices are also known as "friends" for example, as they are in the UK.

Tricams

A tricam is a device that can be used as either active or passive protection. It consists of a shaped aluminium block attached to a length of tape (webbing). The block is shaped so that pulling on the tape makes it cam against the crack, gripping the rock tighter. Careful placement is necessary so that the "cam" does not loosen when not loaded. It is generally not as easy to place or remove as a SLCD but is much cheaper and lighter, and often is the only thing that will work in  situations like quarry drill-holes and limestone pockets.  The smaller sizes can work well in old piton scars, and can also be used passively as nuts.

Training equipment  

Various items of equipment are employed during climbing-specific training to strengthen the climber fingers and tendons.

Hangboards 

A wooden or plastic resin board used for improving strength and endurance for climbers. It develops the forearm muscles along with the tendons and pulleys of the fingers. It can also be used to do complimentary exercises to develop the core muscles and antagonist muscles.

They consist of a variety of different-sized pockets and edges that are designed to be hung from with various training protocols. These pockets and edges can range from large jug holds to micro crimp edges. When used effectively they can facilitate huge gains in forearm strength and lock off strength, mostly in the flexor digitorum profundus, Lumbricals of the hand and flexor digitorum superficialis muscles of the forearms. They have to be used with the proper technique and should be avoided if the user is just starting in the sport to prevent injuries, that can happen specially in the A1-4 pulleys or along sections of flexor carpi sheath linking the different FDP or FDS sections in the forearm or in the rotator cuff in the shoulders.

Following a well established hangboard training protocol is a very efficient way of significantly improving the most important physical aspects of rock climbing over the long term, including maximum finger strength, finger contact strength, local anaerobic forearm endurance, and local aerobic forearm endurance. Training is usually done in cycles to mimic the pattern of muscle exertion while climbing, and is built around the concept of Isometric exercise.

Hangboards are usually mounted above a doorway, or anywhere that allows the user's body to hang freely. One of the best available attachment areas is to roof beams. They are also called fingerboards.

Grip savers 

A small device that can help in developing the antagonist muscles to those used while gripping with the hand.  Use of such a device can prevent the ligament injuries that are frequently experienced by climbers.

Campus boards 

A series of horizontal rungs attached to an overhanging surface that may be climbed up and down without the aid of the feet.  When used properly, campus boards can improve finger strength and so-called "contact strength".

Bachar ladder

It can help improve overall upper body strength as well as core strength.

Specialized clothing 

In the 1980s and early 1990s, the trend was to wear tight, brightly coloured clothes often made from Spandex. The trend, in 2019, is to wear looser-fitting clothing. Trousers can be tailored to prevent them from restricting movement by adding features such as articulated knee joints and diamond crotch.

Belay gloves 

A belay glove is a glove constructed from either leather or a synthetic substitute, is used to protect the hands when belaying, and is especially useful  if using a classic or body belay. They are also very useful for controlling the  belay with single, lead ropes that are 9.5 mm or smaller. Ultimately, belay gloves can lessen the possibility of rope burn and the subsequent involuntary release of the rope.

Climbing shoes 

Specifically designed foot wear is usually worn for climbing. To increase the grip of the foot on a climbing wall or rock face due to friction, the shoe is soled with a vulcanized rubber layer. Usually, shoes are only a few millimetres thick and fit very snugly around the foot.  Stiffer shoes are used for "edging", more compliant ones for "smearing". Some have foam padding on the heel to make descents and rappels more comfortable. Climbing shoes can be re-soled which decreases the frequency that shoes need to be replaced.

Helmet 

The climbing helmet is a piece of safety equipment that primarily protects the skull against falling debris (such as rocks or dropped pieces of protection) and impact forces during a fall. For example, if a lead climber allows the rope to wrap behind an ankle, a fall can flip the climber over and consequently impact the back of the head. Furthermore, any effects of pendulum from a fall that have not been compensated for by the belayer may also result in head injury to the climber. The risk of head injury to a falling climber can be further significantly mitigated by falling correctly.

Climbers may decide whether to wear a helmet based on a number of factors such as the type of climb being attempted, concerns about weight, reductions in agility, added encumbrances, or simple vanity. Additionally, there is less incentive to wear a helmet in artificial climbing environments like indoor climbing walls (where routes and holds are regularly maintained) than on natural multi-pitch routes or ice climbing routes (where falling rocks and/or ice are likely).

Miscellaneous

Chalk 

Climbing chalk is now used by nearly all genres of climbers (traditional, sport, free solo, etc.) to absorb problematic moisture, often sweat, on their hands.  US boulderer John Gill is largely credited with introducing "gymnastic chalk" to climbing in the 1950s (he was a gymnast himself).

Typically, chalk is stored as a loose powder in a special chalk bag designed to prevent spillage, most often closed with a drawstring. This chalk bag is then hung by a carabiner from the climbing harness or from a simple belt worn around the climber's waist. This allows the climber to re-chalk during the climb with minimal interruption or effort. To prevent excess chalking (which can actually decrease friction), some climbers will store their chalk in a chalk ball, which is then kept in the chalk bag. A chalk ball is a very fine, mesh sack that allows chalk release with minimum leakage when squeezed so that the climber can control the amount of chalk on their hands.

A chalk build-up on the natural rock of outdoor climbs is considered to be a potential eyesore, In the United States, the Bureau of Land Management advocates the use of chalk that matches the color of the native rock. Several popular climbing areas, like Arches National Park in Utah, have banned white chalk, instead allowing the use of rock-colored chalk. A handful of companies make colored chalk or a chalk substitute designed to comply with these environmental conservation measures. Garden of the Gods in Colorado has gone further, banning the use of all chalk and chalk substitutes outright.

Gear sling 
A gear sling is usually used in traditional climbing, or big wall climbing when the climber has too much protection gear to fit onto the gear loops of their harnesses. The simplest forms are homemade slings of webbing; more elaborate forms are padded.

Haul bag 
A haul bag refers to a large, tough, and often unwieldy bag into which supplies and climbing equipment can be thrown.  A rucksack or day pack often has webbing and haul loops on the top edge. They are commonly used in big wall climbing due to their tough nature so they and be rubbed along the rock without the bag breaking. Haul bags are often affectionately known as "pigs" due to their unwieldy nature.

Medical tape 
Medical tape (note that "tape" can also refer to Webbing), is useful to both prevent and repair minor injuries. For example, the medical tape is often used to fix flappers.  Many climbers use tape to bind fingers or wrists to prevent recurring tendon problems. Tape is also highly desirable for protecting a climber's hands whilst climbing on routes that consist mostly of repeated hand jamming; a major example being on El Capitan in Yosemite.

References

Climbing equipment
Mountaineering equipment